The Pakistan Journal of Life and Social Sciences is a biannual peer-reviewed academic journal covering life sciences and social sciences research. It was established in 2003 and is published by the Elite Scientific Forum, Pakistan. The editor-in-chief is Masood Akhtar (Bahauddin Zakariya University).

Reception
A study conducted by Ikram-ul-Haq of King Saud bin Abdulaziz University for Health Sciences to "explore the progress of social science research carried out by Pakistan", which was based on the "data retrieved from the Scopus database" and was concluded in November 2020, suggested that the journal had been one of the most "preferred source of publications" on the subject in Pakistan.

Abstracting and indexing
The journal is abstracted and indexed in:
Aquatic Sciences and Fisheries Abstracts
CAB Abstracts
EBSCO databases
Scopus
The Zoological Record

References

External links

Publications established in 2003
Biology journals
Sociology journals
Biannual journals
English-language journals
Delayed open access journals